The first election to Fermanagh County Council took place in April 1899 as part of that year's Irish local elections.

The election saw the council split evenly between Unionists and Nationalists. Concurrent district council elections saw Nationalists and Unionists both win 33 seats for Enniskillen Rural Council. Nationalists won a large majority on Enniskillen Board of Guardians, as 8 Cavan Divisions (which all returned Nationalists) were joined to the union. Nationalists won a majority on Lisnaskea Guardians and District Council, while Unionists won control of Irvinestown Council.

Aggregate results

Ward results

Belleek

Crum

Derrylea

Derrylester

Enniskillen

Florencecourt

Garrison

Inishmacsaint

Lack

Lisnaskea

Magheravelly

Monea

Newtonbutler

Rosslea

Irvinestown

Laragh

Cross

Kesh

Maguiresbridge

Lisbellaw

Enniskillen Urban Guardians

References

County Fermanagh
Elections in County Fermanagh